Grissom is a lunar impact crater that lies on the far side of the Moon. It is located just to the south of the huge walled plain Apollo, and to the northeast of the crater Cori. The rim of Grissom is eroded in places, particularly along the northeast where a pair of small craters lie along the sides. There is a clustering of small craterlets located to the south of the crater midpoint. A small crater lies along the northeast edge of the floor.

The crater is named after astronaut Gus Grissom, killed in the Apollo 1 fire.  The nearby craters White and Chaffee were named after the other two astronauts killed in the disaster, Ed White and Roger Chaffee.

Satellite craters 

By convention these features are identified on lunar maps by placing the letter on the side of the crater midpoint that is closest to Grissom.

References 

 
 
 
 
 
 
 
 
 
 
 
 

Impact craters on the Moon
Gus Grissom